Blitzkrieg 2 is a real-time tactics computer game based on the events of World War II, the game is an evolution of its predecessor Blitzkrieg and is the second title in the Blitzkrieg (video game series). The game takes place in North Africa, the Pacific and Europe, and features the 6 different factions portrayed in the game that fought in their battle respective grounds during the war.

Gameplay
As its predecessor and the similar Sudden Strike games, Blitzkrieg 2 focuses on the battles of World War II rather than real-time strategy aspects like base building and resource extraction. The game features many new features and units over its predecessor; the graphics engine is upgraded, allowing for full 3D and the game features over 250 units compared to Blitzkriegs 200. In Blitzkrieg 2, the players can choose from three separate campaigns: The Nazi German Campaign, the American Campaign, and the Soviet Campaign, each divided into four distinct chapters. The German campaign begins in France, 1940, where the player is put in command of German offensive forces in an effort to conquer France. Here, they may use the signature Blitzkrieg strategy. The second chapter is set in the North Africa Campaign, which ends with the capture of Tobruk by Axis forces. The third is in the Soviet Union, during Case Blue. The fourth chapter is staged in the Ardennes during the Battle of the Bulge, 1944. The American campaign has its first 3 chapters in the Pacific theater, where the players lead your forces against the IJA (Imperial Japanese Army) and IJN (Imperial Japanese Navy) in a number of missions beginning shortly after the attack on Pearl Harbor. The final chapter of the American campaign is set in the German Ruhr in 1945, during the invasion of Germany. The Soviet Campaign begins shortly after Operation Barbarossa, going through the 5 years of the war against Germany eventually ending with the Soviet victory at the Battle of Berlin. At the end of each campaign, a short cinematic plays.

The game contains six factions: Germany, Soviet Union, United Kingdom, Japan, United States and France.

Reception
The game received positive reviews before release, yet never achieved the same long lived success its predecessor had achieved, even though two expansions and numerous spin-offs were made.

 Add-ons 
The base game Blitzkrieg 2 was released together with both add-ons as Blitzkrieg 2 Anthology:
 Blitzkrieg 2: Fall Of The Reich: the first expansion pack, it was released in Russia and Germany in Autumn 2006, and in the EU and the US in January-February 2007., It was subtitled as Retribution in Russia, and The Last Stand in Germany.
 Blitzkrieg 2: Liberation: the second expansion pack, was released in January 2007 in Russia and on October 12 in the EU. It was developed by MindLink Studio Ltd.,

 Spin-off games 
 Frontline: Fields of Thunder: this spin-off from Nival Interactive and N-Game Studios was released on April 9, 2007 (probably initially in the Russian market at end of 2006) at a retail price of US$29.99. MobyGames entry indicates the game was on sale in USA & Germany in March 2007, and Australia in April. It was released by N-Game Studios. It is also known as Great battles: Kursk Bulge in the Russian market.
 Great Battles: Battle of Tobruk by the company Arise Games was one of various other spin-offs of which however, some were released exclusively in Russia, Nival Interactive's home country. Battle of Tobruk was released in February 2007.
 Great Battles: Landing in Normandy by the company Arise Inc. was another unofficial spin-off game in Arise's Great Battles lineup. It was released in April 2007.,,
 Great Battles: Stalingrad by a different company, N-Game Studios. It was yet another iteration in the unofficial Great Battles lineup built on the Blitzkrieg 2 engine. It was released in August 2007., It is unrelated to the Stalingrad spin-off game built on the Blitzkrieg engine and released in 2005.

 Non-WWII based 
 Stalin vs. Martians (2009) by a consortium of three developers - Black Wing Foundation, Dreamlore, & N-Game Studios. Using the Blitzkrieg 2 engine but with poor, action-oriented and rather basic mechanics, it was a parody of WWII real-time strategy titles, with the story pitting the Soviets against fictional Martians in Siberia. It was released in April 2009. It was sold on Steam at the same time, but it may have been delisted since then.
 X-Team: Day of Freedom''' by Ukrainian developers N-Game Studios.,. It is a Blitzkrieg 2 engine based game with a sci-fi setting where the player organizes an X-Team squad to defend the Earth against an alien civilization. It is a classic mix of role-playing game and strategy, inspired by Fallout, Command & Conquer, Rage of Mages and Dungeon Siege. It cannot stand up against large modern RPGs in content and graphics but provides fans of the original with an injection of nostalgia. It was released in retail in May 2008, and re-released on Steam in December 2019.

References

See also
Blitzkrieg (video game series)
Blitzkrieg (video game)Blitzkrieg 3''
cdv Software Entertainment
Nival Interactive

2005 video games
1C Company games
Windows games
Windows-only games
Real-time tactics video games
World War II video games
Video game sequels
Video games developed in Russia
Enigma Engine games
Multiplayer and single-player video games
Video games set in France
Video games set in the Soviet Union
Video games set in Germany
Video games set in Berlin
Video games set in Belgium
Video games set in the Philippines
Video games set in Libya
Video games set in Latvia
Video games set in Hungary
Video games set in Russia
Video games set in Ukraine
Video games set in Belarus
Video games set in the Solomon Islands
Video games set in Italy
Video games set in the Netherlands
Video games set in Luxembourg
Pacific War video games
CDV Software Entertainment games